Makkhawan Rangsan Bridge (usually shortened to "Makkhawan Bridge") is an historic bridge of inner Bangkok. The bridge spans Khlong Phadung Krung Kasem (Phadung Krung Kasem canal) on Ratchadamnoen avenue  (section outer Ratchadamnoen) on the border of Bang Khun Phrom sub-district, Phra Nakhon district and Wat Sommanat sub-district, Pom Prap Sattru Phai district with Dusit sub-district, Dusit district. It is near to the offices of the United Nations in Thailand, Rajadamnern Boxing Stadium, Wat Sommanas Rajavaravihara, Wat Makutkasattriyaram and Government House. It also serves as a four-way intersection of Ratchadamnoen, Krung Kasem and Luk Luang roads.

The bridge is one of five built across Khlong Phadung Krung Kasem during the reign of King Chulalongkorn (Rama V). It was designed by Italian architect Carlo Allegri using the patterns of Italian and Spanish architecture. The prototype was from Pont Alexandre III of Paris. Construction took a total of three years. The bridge has a beautiful Erawan (Airavata) steel frame and four marble lampposts and is considered is one of the most beautiful bridges in Bangkok. It was inaugurated on Sunday, November 1st 1903 by His Majesty King Chulalongkorn (Rama V).

All five extant bridges built to cross the Khlong Phadung Krung Kasem were constructed during the same period. They each have  rhyming names, that mean "bridge built by the deities". The term "Makkhawan Rangsan" translates  as "the bridge that Makkhawan (Indra) was the creator". King Chulalongkorn originally intended to name it "Makkhawan Rangrak" (มัฆวานรังรักษ์). 

In 1994, two more bridges were added to increase the traffic lanes under a royal project of King Bhumibol Adulyadej (Rama IX).

During the political unrest between 2010 and 2014 the bridge was used as a venue for several political demonstrations as were other landmarks on Ratchadamnoen avenue, such as Democracy Monument, Phan Fa Lilat Bridge and Khok Wua Intersection.

See also
Wisukam Narueman Bridge
Thewakam Rangrak Bridge

References 

Phra Nakhon district
Road junctions in Bangkok
Bridges in Bangkok
Dusit district
Pom Prap Sattru Phai district
Bridges completed in 1903
Registered ancient monuments in Bangkok